Linus Dahlander (born June 20, 1979 in Sweden)  is an innovation researcher  specializing in crowdsourcing, open innovation, and online communities. He is a professor at the European School of Management and Technology and holds the Lufthansa Group Chair in Innovation. He also served as Associate Editor of the Academy of Management Journal.

Career 
Linus Dahlander got a PhD at Chalmers University of Technology. Following his PhD he did a Post Doc at Stanford University in the Scancor program. Afterwards he became a professor at the European School of Management and Technology where he holds the Lufthansa Group Chair in Innovation.

Dahlander is a leading researcher on the topics of Crowdsourcing, Open Innovation, and Online Communities. His paper with David Gann on "How open is open innovation" has become one of the highest cited pieces in the field of open innovation. He has published in a wide range of top academic journals such as the Administrative Science Quarterly, Organization Science, Research Policy, and the Academy of Management Journal.

Dahlander also got selected to serve as an associate editor of the Academy of Management Journal.

Books 
Dahlander, L., Lars Frederiksen and Francesco Rullani. "Online communities and open innovation: Governance and symbolic value creation"  Routledge; 1 edition (March 21, 2011).

Awards and recognition 
2017 Best 40 Under 40 Professors. Poets & Quants, March 2017.
Recipient of Jürgen-Hauschildt-Award of  the  Technology,  Innovation  and  Entrepreneurship  section  of  the  VHB  -  German  Academic Association for Business Research for the best research publication in innovation management, 2016.
Recipient of TUM  Research  Excellence  Award  of  the  Peter  Pribilla  Foundation for  outstanding  research  in  Innovation  and  Leadership, 2016.

References

External links 
Linus Dahlander's profile on Google Scholar

1979 births
Living people
Swedish scientists
Management scientists